Hvidovre station is a station on the Taastrup radial of the S-train network in Copenhagen, Denmark. It is located about 1 km north of the old village of Hvidovre, in the far northwestern corner in Hvidovre municipality. The station thus also serves areas in the neighbouring Rødovre and Copenhagen municipalities, whereas the larger part of Hvidovre municipality is actually better served by stations on the Køge radial.

Cultural references
Hvidovre station is seen at 1:20:36 in the 1975 Olsen-banden film The Olsen Gang on the Track.

See also
 List of railway stations in Denmark

References

External links

S-train (Copenhagen) stations
Hvidovre Municipality
Railway stations opened in 1953
1953 establishments in Denmark
Buildings and structures in Hvidovre Municipality
Railway stations in Denmark opened in the 20th century